God's Balls is the debut album by the alternative rock band Tad. It was released in 1989 on Sub Pop, and re-released in 2016 as a deluxe edition. The band promoted the album by undertaking a European tour with labelmates Nirvana.

Production
The album was produced by Jack Endino. The band's goal was to create an album lacking harmony and melody.

Critical reception
Trouser Press called the album "impressively punishing," writing that "the riff-heavy 'Behemoth', 'Satan’s Chainsaw' and especially the Ed Gein-inspired 'Nipple Belt' hit like a succession of knees to the groin, with Doyle’s rugged, sneering vocals adding insult to injury." PopMatters wrote: "Relying on legendary Seattle producer Jack Endino to help translate their monolithic live sound to record, the band set about doing what they do best -- namely channeling ‘70s heavy metal into something even heavier and more oppressive than any of their forebears could’ve imagined."

Track listing
 "Behemoth" - 4:10
 "Pork Chop" - 4:22
 "Helot" - 2:58
 "Tuna Car" - 2:37
 "Sex God Missy (Lumberjack Mix)" - 4:29
 "Cyanide Bath" - 3:37
 "Boiler Room" - 4:49
 "Satan's Chainsaw" - 3:10
 "Hollow Man" - 4:05
 "Nipple Belt" - 3:17

Personnel
Tad Doyle - Vocals, Guitar
Kurt Danielson - Bass
Gary Thorstensen - Guitar
Steve Wied - Drums

Jack Endino - Production, Engineering, Mastering
Charles Peterson - Photography

Charts

References

Tad (band) albums
1989 debut albums
Sub Pop albums
Albums produced by Jack Endino